Stelis susanensis is a species of orchid plant native to Brazil.

References 

susanensis
Flora of Brazil